Thomas Burgess was the founder of Bala, Ontario, Canada (now part of the cottage country region of Muskoka), who first settled there in 1868 and established a sawmill and a general store.

References 

Year of birth missing
Year of death missing
Immigrants to pre-Confederation Ontario
People from the District Municipality of Muskoka
Immigrants to the Province of Canada